The Ambassador from Israel to Ecuador was Israel's foremost diplomatic representative in Ecuador

List of Former Ambassadors

Edwin Yabo 2016 - 
Eliyahu Yerushalmi 2012-2016
Eyal Sela 2007 - 2012
Daniel Saban 2003 - 2007
Reda Mansour 2001 - 2003
Yosef Hasseen 1999 - 2001
Yaacov Paran 1996 - 1999
Medad Medina 1991 - 1996
Avraham Setton 1987 - 1991
Zvi Tenney 1984 - 1987
Eliezer Armon (Non-Resident, Guatemala City) 1981 - 1984
Naftali Gal 1978
Sinai Rome 1976 - 1978
Avraham Sarlouis 1964 - 1967
Eliezer Doron (Non-Resident, Santiago) 1962 - 1963
Tuvia Arazi (Non-Resident, Lima) 1956 - 1960

References 

Ecuador
Israel